The following is a list of public universities in Texas by enrollment.

See also
Education in Texas
List of largest United States university campuses by enrollment

References

External links
 Texas Higher Education Data

Enrollment

Universities by enrollment
Texas